Only Forever may refer to:

Albums
 Only Forever (Alive Like Me album)
 Only Forever (Bing Crosby album)
 Only Forever (Puressence album)

Songs
 "Only Forever" (song) (Bing Crosby song)
 "Only Forever", a song on Demi Lovato's album Tell Me You Love Me